is an 8-dan professional Go player.

Biography 
Kikuyo joined the Nihon Ki-in in 1981. She is the sister of Shinichi Aoki, who is a 9 dan professional at the Nihon Ki-in. Kikuyo has won 10 major titles.

Promotion Record

Titles

See also 

 International Go Federation
 List of Go organizations
 List of professional Go tournaments

References 

1968 births
Japanese Go players
Living people
Female Go players